YouTube may suspend accounts, temporarily or permanently, from their social networking service. Suspensions of high-profile individuals from YouTube are unusual and when they occur, often attract attention in the media.

List of notable suspensions

See also 
 Deplatforming
 Twitter suspensions

References

Lists of Internet suspensions

Suspensions
Suspensions
Criticism of Google